Cymia is a genus of sea snails, marine gastropod mollusks in the family Muricidae, the murex snails or rock snails.

Species
 Cymia tectum (W. Wood, 1828)

References

 
Monotypic gastropod genera